Sonny Blu Lo-Everton (born 15 September 2002) is a professional footballer who plays for  club Wealdstone on loan from Derby County.

Club career 
Lo-Everton began his career at Watford, joining the club's academy in 2011. He was featured in The Guardians Next Generation 2019 list, named as one of the most talented prospects in Premier League academies.

He joined National League club Wealdstone on a short-term loan, helping the club to retain its place in the fifth tier. After making several appearances in Watford's pre-season friendlies, Lo-Everton was loaned out again to Yeovil Town at the beginning of the 2021–22 season, reuniting with former Watford youth coach Darren Sarll, and featured in the Glovers' 1–0 victory over League Two Stevenage in the second round of the FA Cup.

In September 2022, he signed a one-year contract at Derby County. On 27 February 2023, Lo-Everton rejoined National League side Wealdstone on loan until the end of the 2022–23 season.

International career 
Lo-Everton is eligible to represent England, Scotland, Hong Kong and China at international level. Lo-Everton chose to represent Scotland at international level, qualifying through his grandmother. He was selected at Under-17, Under-18 and Under-19 level.

Career statistics

References 

2002 births
Living people
Footballers from Greater London
Scottish footballers
English footballers
English people of Scottish descent
English people of Hong Kong descent
English people of Chinese descent
Scottish people of Hong Kong descent
Scottish people of Chinese descent
Association football midfielders
Watford F.C. players
Wealdstone F.C. players
Yeovil Town F.C. players
Derby County F.C. players
National League (English football) players